French ship Romulus may refer to the following ships of the French Navy:

 , a 44-gun ship of the Royal Navy launched in 1771 and captured by the French
 , a  74-gun ship of the line of the French Navy

See also
 

French Navy ship names